Christopher Sackville (by 1519 – 1558/1559), of Albourne and Worth, Sussex, was an English politician.

Family
He was the father of John Sackville, MP for East Grinstead.

Career
He was a Member of Parliament (MP) for Heytesbury in 1558.

References

1550s deaths
English MPs 1558
Year of birth uncertain
People from Worth, West Sussex
People from Albourne